Paul Petit (1914 – 1981/06/14) was a 20th-century French historian, a specialist in ancient Rome. He was a professor at the University of Grenoble.

Bibliography 
1962: Précis d'Histoire Ancienne
1967: La paix romaine, Presses universitaires de France, series "Nouvelle Clio – L’histoire et ses problèmes"
1974: Histoire générale de l’Empire romain, Le Seuil,

References

External links 
 Paul Petit, Histoire générale de l'Empire romain (compte rendu) on Persée 
 Paul Petit, La Paix romaine (compte rendu) by André Chastagnol on Persée 
 Paul Petit, La Paix romaine (compte rendu) by Claude Sterckx on Persée

20th-century French historians
French scholars of Roman history
1914 births
1981 deaths